Camas  is a city in Clark County, Washington, with a population of 26,065 at the 2020 census. The east side of town borders the city of Washougal, Washington, and the west side of town borders Vancouver, Washington. Camas lies along the Washington side of the Columbia River, across from Troutdale, Oregon, and is part of the Portland metropolitan area.

One of the major geographical features of the city is Prune Hill.  Prune Hill is an extinct volcanic vent and is part of the Boring Lava Field of northwest Oregon and southwest Washington.

History
Officially incorporated on June 18, 1906, the city is named after the camas lily, a plant with an onion-like bulb prized by Native Americans. At the west end of downtown Camas is the large Georgia-Pacific paper mill from which the high school teams get their name, "the Papermakers". A paper mill was first established in the city in 1883 with the support of Henry Pittock, a wealthy entrepreneur from England who had settled in Portland, Oregon, where he published The Oregonian.

Pittock's LaCamas Colony bought 2,600 acres in 1883, forming the Columbia River Paper Company the following year to begin production in 1885, before merging with Oregon City's Crown Paper Company to form Crown Columbia Paper in 1905. After converting from steam to electricity in 1913, Crown merged with Willamette Paper in 1914 and then with Zellerbach Paper in 1928. Crown Zellerbach became the largest paper manufacturer on the west coast. During World War II, the Camas mill temporarily manufactured parts and components for US Naval vessels produced at the nearby Kaiser Shipyards. In 1950, the Camas mill was the first factory to produce folded paper napkins. "Crown Z" was the area's biggest employer in 1971, with 2,643 of approximately 3,700 Clark County paper mill workers. In 1986, Crown Zellerbach was absorbed by James River Corporation; after further mergers with the Fort Howard Paper Company in 1997 and  Georgia-Pacific in 2000,  Koch Industries acquired Georgia-Pacific and the Camas mill in 2005. In 2018, Koch announced plans to lay off approximately 200–300 workers, shutting down all equipment related to communications paper, fine paper conversion and pulping operations.

By 1971, there had been four attempts to merge Camas and Washougal that were denied by voters.

Historically, the commercial base of the city was almost entirely the paper mill; In recent years, however, the diversity of industries in and near Camas has been enhanced considerably by the influx of several high-tech, white-collar companies. These include Hewlett-Packard, Linear Technology, WaferTech and Underwriters Laboratories. Annual events include the summer "Camas Days", as well as other festivals and celebrations.

Geography

There are numerous bodies of water within the city limits, including Lacamas Lake, Lacamas Creek, Round Lake, Fallen Leaf Lake, Tug Lake, the Washougal River, and the Columbia River.

Public parks

There are numerous parks in Camas and within the Camas area, including:

Lacamas Park encompasses Round Lake and runs against SR 500 on its west side. Across SR 500 is Lacamas Lake. The park is open year-round and includes barbecues, a playground, trails around the park and lake, and access to the Camas Potholes. The park includes trails which lead to the Camas Potholes and the Camas lily fields, as well as a  loop around Round Lake. Water activities in Round Lake are also common around summer time. Bathrooms are available on a seasonal basis only.

Heritage Park has facilities for launching boats into Lacamas Lake, a playground, much open field, and trails through the trees. The parking lot is large and includes numerous long parking stalls to accommodate vehicles with trailers.

Demographics

2010 census
As of the census of 2010, there were 19,355 people, 6,619 households, and 5,241 families residing in the city. The racial makeup of the city was 87.4% White, 1.0% African American, 0.6% Native American, 6.0% Asian, 0.2% Pacific Islander, 1.2% from other races, and 3.6% from two or more races. Hispanic or Latino of any race were 4.1% of the population.

There were 6,619 households, of which 46.5% had children under the age of 18 living with them, 65.7% were married couples living together, 8.9% had a female householder with no husband present, 4.6% had a male householder with no wife present, and 20.8% were non-families. 16.2% of all households were made up of individuals, and 4.9% had someone living alone who was 65 years of age or older. The average household size was 2.91 and the average family size was 3.27.

The median age in the city was 36.9 years. 31.1% of residents were under the age of 18; 6.5% were between the ages of 18 and 24; 27.1% were from 25 to 44; 26.8% were from 45 to 64; and 8.7% were 65 years of age or older. The gender makeup of the city was 49.6% male and 50.4% female.

2000 census
As of the census of 2000, there were 12,534 people, 4,480 households, and 3,422 families residing in the city.  The population density was 1,149.3 people per square mile (443.6/km).  There were 4,736 housing units at an average density of 434.3 per square mile (167.6/km).  The racial makeup of the city was 92.01% White, 0.69% African American, 0.69% Native American, 3.41% Asian, 0.14% Pacific Islander, 0.80% from other races, and 2.26% from two or more races. Hispanic or Latino of any race were 2.86% of the population. 18.8% were of German, 11.3% English, 9.6% American, 8.2% Irish and 5.6% Norwegian ancestry.

There were 4,480 households, out of which 42.6% had children under the age of 18 living with them, 63.9% were married couples living together, 8.5% had a female householder with no husband present, and 23.6% were non-families. 18.6% of all households were made up of individuals, and 6.5% had someone living alone who was 65 years of age or older.  The average household size was 2.78 and the average family size was 3.19.

In the city, the age distribution of the population shows 31.2% under the age of 18, 6.2% from 18 to 24, 32.5% from 25 to 44, 21.4% from 45 to 64, and 8.7% who were 65 years of age or older.  The median age was 34 years. For every 100 females, there were 96.2 males.  For every 100 females age 18 and over, there were 94.6 males.

The median income for a household in the city was $60,187, and the median income for a family was $64,885. Males had a median income of $51,470 versus $31,985 for females. The per capita income for the city was $27,267.  About 4.4% of families and 5.4% of the population were below the poverty line, including 6.4% of those under age 18 and 4.7% of those age 65 or over.

Education

Sister cities
Camas has the following sister cities, according to the Lieutenant Governor's Office:

  Hamamatsu, Japan
  Taki, Mie, Japan
  Krapkowice, Poland
  Morawica, Poland
  Zabierzów, Poland

Notable people
 Michael R. Barratt, NASA astronaut
 Greg Biffle, NASCAR driver
 Jaime Herrera Beutler, U.S. Representative
 Shane Chen, inventor and entrepreneur
 Niko De Vera, professional soccer player for the Portland Timbers
 Alexa Efraimson, professional runner for Nike
 Kenneth Fisher, Forbes columnist, financial author, money manager
 Denis Hayes, environmental activist, coordinated first Earth Day
 Jimmie Rodgers, 1950s pop singer
 Taylor Williams, Major League Baseball player for the San Diego Padres
 Wendy Wilson, singer, member of 1990s girl group Wilson Phillips

Gallery

References

External links

 Official website
 History of Camas at HistoryLink

 
Cities in Washington (state)
Cities in Clark County, Washington
Populated places established in 1883
1883 establishments in Washington Territory
Portland metropolitan area
Washington (state) populated places on the Columbia River